Pentti Sammallahti (born 1950 in Helsinki) is a Finnish photographer. He is the only brother of Finnish linguist Pekka Sammallahti.

He taught at the Art and Design University in Helsinki for 17 years. In 1991 he was given a twenty-year grant by the Finnish government.

References

1950 births
Living people
Finnish photographers